Guy H. Lillian III is a Louisiana lawyer, former letterhack and  science fiction fanzine publisher notable for having been twice nominated for a Hugo Award as best fan writer and having had a row of 12 nominations (without winning) for the Hugo for best fanzine for Challenger, which he has published since 1993. He is the 1984 recipient of Southern fandom's Rebel Award.

Having studied English at Berkeley, writing at the Greensboro, and law at New Orleans, he practiced as a defense lawyer in the field of criminal law in Louisiana as his day job. As of 2015, Lillian is a resident of Florida.

As a noted letterhack and fan of the comic book Green Lantern, Lillian's name was tributized for the title's 1968 debut character Guy Gardner.

References

External links
 Nerd Team 30 Interview with Guy Lillian III, 2018

Living people
Louisiana lawyers
Year of birth missing (living people)